Jakobsen is both a surname and a given name. Notable people with the name include:

Surname
 Alf E. Jakobsen (born 1952), Norwegian politician
 Anna Sofie Jakobsen (1860–1913), Norwegian Christian missionary
 Annika Jakobsen (born 1997), Danish handballer
 Carolyn Jakobsen (born 1947), Australian politician
 Egon Jakobsen (born 1948), Danish politician
 Else Marie Jakobsen (1927–2012), Norwegian designer and textile artist
 Fabio Jakobsen (born 1996), Dutch cyclist
 Frode Jakobsen (1906–1997), Danish politician
 Gidsken Jakobsen (1908–1990), Norwegian aviation pioneer
 Gunnar Jakobsen (1916–1992), Norwegian politician
 Hans Jakobsen (1895–1980), Danish gymnast
 Helge Jakobsen (1901–1996), Norwegian politician
 Henning Lynge Jakobsen (born 1962), Danish canoer
 Henrik Jakobsen (handballer) (born 1992), Norwegian handball player
 Henrik Jakobsen (curler), Danish curler
 Henrik Plenge Jakobsen (born 1967), Danish conceptual artist
 Jakob Jakobsen (1864–1918), Faroese linguist
 Jasna Jakobsen, Norwegian wind engineer
 Jóannes Jakobsen (born 1961), Faroese footballer
 Johan J. Jakobsen (born 1937), Norwegian politician
 Jonny Jakobsen (born 1963), Swedish musician
 Lars Jakobsen (born 1961), Danish footballer
 Lynge Jakobsen (born 1950), Danish footballer
 Michael Jakobsen (born 1986), Danish footballer
 Mimi Jakobsen (born 1948), Danish politician
 Mini Jakobsen (born 1965), Norwegian footballer
 Øistein Jakobsen (1907–1947), Norwegian politician
 Ólavur Jakobsen (born 1964), Faroese guitarist
 Ole Jakobsen (1942–2010), Danish chess master
 Simon Jakobsen (born 1990), Danish footballer
 Svend Jakobsen (1935–2022), Danish politician
 Tariq Jakobsen (born 1974), Danish graphic design artist
 Thomas Jakobsen (21st century), Danish mathematician

Given name 
 Knut Severin Jakobsen Vik (1892–1972), Norwegian politician
 Olav Jakobsen Høyem (1830–1899), Norwegian teacher

See also
 Jacobsen (disambiguation)
 Jakobson (disambiguation)
 Jameson (name)

Danish-language surnames
Norwegian-language surnames
Patronymic surnames
Surnames from given names